In Andorra, vehicle registration plates are composed of one letter and four digits (e.g. The plates feature embossed black serials on a white background.

History
The first Andorran license plates were issued in around 1930 and also featured black serials on white background. These were composed of the letters "AND" followed by four numbers, e.g., AND 1234.
A new series was issued in 2011. They now feature country code (AND) in the bottom the coat of arms.

Special plates
MT - Used as a temporary plate, the MT means Matrícula Temporal. The plates are composed of two letters in a red box, four numbers and the expiry date in another red box.
PROVA - Used as a dealer plate. The plates are composed of max. three numbers in a red color, expiration year in left of plate, and letter PROVA in the bottom. The color of the plate is red on green.
X nnn X - Diplomatic car plate. The plates are composed of one letter, max. three number and one letter. The color of the plate is white on light blue.
VEHICLES ESPECIALS - Special vehicles and three numbers only. The color of the plate is red on white.
Official vehicles use an Andorra's tricolor flag without emblems.

Sources
https://aca.ad/serveis/plaques-de-matricula

http://diariandorra.ad/index.php?option=com_k2&view=item&id=10570
http://www.elperiodicdandorra.com/tema-del-dia/9101-matricules-menys-altes-i-mes-europeitzades.html

External links

 Andorra's license plates

Andorra
Andorra transport-related lists
Road transport in Andorra